The Diamond Sutra (Sanskrit: Vajracchedikā Prajñāpāramitā Sūtra) is a Mahāyāna (Buddhist) sutra from the genre of Prajñāpāramitā ('perfection of wisdom') sutras. Translated into a variety of languages over a broad geographic range, the Diamond Sūtra is one of the most influential Mahayana sutras in East Asia, and it is particularly prominent within the Chan (or Zen) tradition, along with the Heart Sutra.

A copy of the Tang dynasty–Chinese version of the Diamond Sūtra was found among the Dunhuang manuscripts in 1900 by Daoist monk Wang Yuanlu and sold to Aurel Stein in 1907. They are dated back to 11 May 868. It is, in the words of the British Library, "the earliest dated printed book".

It is also the first known creative work with an explicit public domain dedication, as its colophon at the end states that it was created "for universal free distribution".

Title
The Sanskrit title for the sūtra is the Vajracchedikā Prajñāpāramitā Sūtra, which may be translated roughly as the "Vajra Cutter Perfection of Wisdom Sūtra" or "The Perfection of Wisdom Text that Cuts Like a Thunderbolt". In English, shortened forms such as Diamond Sūtra and Vajra Sūtra are common. The title relies on the power of the vajra (diamond or thunderbolt, but also an abstract term for a powerful weapon) to cut things as a metaphor for the type of wisdom that cuts and shatters illusions to get to ultimate reality. The sutra is also called by the name "Triśatikā Prajñāpāramitā Sūtra" (300 lines Perfection of Insight sutra).

The Diamond Sūtra is highly regarded in East Asian countries with traditions of Mahayana Buddhism. Translations of this title into the languages of some of these countries include:
 , 
 
 ; shortened to 
 ,

History

The exact date of the composition of the Diamond Sūtra in Sanskrit is uncertain—arguments for the 2nd and 5th centuries have been made. The first Chinese translation dates to the early 5th century, but, by this point, the 4th or 5th century monks Asanga and Vasubandhu seem to have already authored authoritative commentaries on its content.

The Vajracchedika sutra was an influential work in the Mahayana Buddhist tradition. Early translations into a number of languages have been found in locations across Central and East Asia, suggesting that the text was widely studied and translated. In addition to Chinese translations, translations of the text and commentaries were made into Tibetan, and translations, elaborations, and paraphrases survive in a number of Central Asian languages.

The first translation of the Diamond Sūtra into Chinese is thought to have been made in 401  by the venerated and prolific translator Kumārajīva. Kumārajīva's translation style is distinctive, possessing a flowing smoothness that reflects his prioritization on conveying the meaning as opposed to precise literal rendering. The Kumārajīva translation has been particularly highly regarded over the centuries, and it is this version that appears on the 868  Dunhuang scroll. It is the most widely used and chanted Chinese version.

In addition to the Kumārajīva translation, a number of later translations exist. The Diamond Sūtra was again translated from Sanskrit into Chinese by Bodhiruci in 509, Paramārtha in 558, Dharmagupta (twice, in 590 and in 605~616), Xuanzang (twice, in 648 and in 660~663), and Yijing in 703.

The Chinese Buddhist monk Xuanzang visited a Mahāsāṃghika-Lokottaravāda monastery at Bamiyan, Afghanistan, in the 7th century. Using Xuanzang's travel accounts, modern archaeologists have identified the site of this monastery. Birchbark manuscript fragments of several Mahāyāna sūtras have been discovered at the site, including the Vajracchedikā Prajñāpāramitā Sūtra (MS 2385), and these are now part of the Schøyen Collection. This manuscript was written in the Sanskrit language, and written in an ornate form of the Gupta script. This same Sanskrit manuscript also contains the Medicine Buddha Sūtra (Bhaiṣajyaguruvaiḍūryaprabhārāja Sūtra).

The Diamond Sūtra gave rise to a culture of artwork, sūtra veneration, and commentaries in East Asian Buddhism.  By the end of the Tang Dynasty (907) in China there were over 80 commentaries written on it (only 32 survive), such as those by prominent Chinese Buddhists like Sengzhao, Xie Lingyun, Zhiyi, Jizang, Kuiji and Zongmi. Copying and recitation of the Diamond Sutra was a widespread devotional practice, and stories attributing miraculous powers to these acts are recorded in Chinese, Japanese, Tibetan, and Mongolian sources.

One of the best known commentaries is the Exegesis on the Diamond Sutra by Huineng, the Sixth Patriarch of the Chan School. The Diamond Sutra features prominently in the 1st chapter of the Platform Sutra, the religious biography of Huineng, where hearing its recitation is supposed to have triggered the enlightening insight that led Huineng to abandon his life as a woodcutter to become a Buddhist monk.

Contents 

The Vajracchedikā Prajñāpāramitā Sutra contains the discourse of the Buddha to a senior monk, Subhuti. Its major themes are anatman (not-self), the emptiness of all phenomena (though the term 'śūnyatā' itself does not appear in the text), the liberation of all beings without attachment and the importance of spreading and teaching the Diamond Sūtra itself. In his commentary on the Diamond Sūtra, Hsing Yun describes the four main points from the sūtra as giving without attachment to self, liberating beings without notions of self and other, living without attachment, and cultivating without attainment. According to Shigenori Nagatomo, the major goal of the Diamond Sūtra is: "an existential project aiming at achieving and embodying a non-discriminatory basis for knowledge" or "the emancipation from the fundamental ignorance of not knowing how to experience reality as it is".

In the sūtra, the Buddha has finished his daily walk to Sravasti with the monks to gather offerings of food, and he sits down to rest. Elder Subhūti comes forth and asks the Buddha: "How, Lord, should one who has set out on the bodhisattva path take his stand, how should he proceed, how should he control the mind?"
What follows is a dialogue regarding the nature of the "perfection of insight" (Prajñāpāramitā) and the nature of ultimate reality (which is illusory and empty). The Buddha begins by answering Subhuti by stating that he will bring all living beings to final nirvana, but that after this "no living being whatsoever has been brought to extinction". This is because a bodhisattva does not see beings through reified concepts such as "person", "soul" or "self", but sees them through the lens of perfect understanding, as empty of inherent, unchanging self.

The Buddha continues his exposition with similar statements which use negation to point out the emptiness of phenomena, merit, the Dharma (Buddha's teaching), the stages of enlightenment and the Buddha himself. Japanese Buddhologist Hajime Nakamura calls this negation the "logic of not" (na prthak). Further examples of the Diamond Sūtra via negativa include statements such as:
 "As far as 'all dharmas' are concerned, Subhuti, all of them are dharma-less. That is why they are called 'all dharmas'."
 "Those so-called 'streams of thought', Subhuti, have been preached by the Tathagata as streamless. That is why they are called 'streams of thought'."
 All beings', Subhuti, have been preached by the Tathagata as beingless. That is why they are called 'all beings'."

The Buddha is generally thought to be trying to help Subhūti unlearn his preconceived, limited notions of the nature of reality. Emphasizing that all phenomena are ultimately illusory, he teaches that true enlightenment cannot be grasped until one has set aside attachment to them in any form.

Another reason why the Buddha makes use of negation is that language reifies concepts and this can lead to attachment to those concepts, but true wisdom is seeing that nothing is fixed or stable, hence according to the Diamond Sūtra thoughts such as "I have obtained the state of an Arhat" or "I will bring living beings to nirvana" do not even occur in an enlightened one's mind because this would be "seizing upon a self ... seizing upon a living being, seizing upon a soul, seizing upon a person".

The sutra goes on to state that anyone who says such things should not be called a bodhisattva. According to David Kalupahana the goal of the Diamond Sūtra is "one colossal attempt to avoid the extremist use of language, that is, to eliminate any ontological commitment to concepts while at the same time retaining their pragmatic value, so as not to render them totally empty of meaning".

Kalupahana explains the negation of the Diamond Sūtra by seeing an initial statement as an erroneous affirmation of substance or selfhood, which is then critiqued (all dharmas' are dharmaless"), and then finally reconstructed ("that is why they are called 'all dharmas) as being conventional and dependently originated. Kalupahana explains this final reconstruction as meaning: "that each concept, instead of either representing a unique entity or being an empty term, is a substitute for a human experience which is conditioned by a variety of factors. As such, it has pragmatic meaning and communicative power without being absolute in any way." According to Paul Harrison, the Diamond Sūtra central argument here is that "all dharmas lack a self or essence, or to put it in other words, they have no core ontologically, they only appear to exist separately and independently by the power of conventional language, even though they are in fact dependently originated".

The mind of someone who practices the Prajñāpāramitā or "perfection of insight" is then a mind free from fixed substantialist or "self" concepts:

Throughout the teaching, the Buddha repeats that successful memorization and elucidation of even a four-line extract of it is of incalculable merit, better than giving an entire world system filled with gifts and can bring about enlightenment. Section 32 (of the Chinese version) also ends with a four-line gatha:

Paul Harrison's translation of the Sanskrit version states:

Red Pine's translation about life showed that the text read:

Dunhuang block print

There is a woodblock-printed copy of the Diamond Sutra in the British Library which, although not the earliest example of block printing, is the earliest example which bears an actual date.

The archaeologist Sir Marc Aurel Stein purchased it in 1907 in the walled-up Mogao Caves near Dunhuang in northwest China from a monk guarding the caves – known as the "Caves of the Thousand Buddhas".

The colophon, at the inner end, reads:

In 2010 UK writer and historian Frances Wood, head of the Chinese section at the British Library, Mark Barnard, conservator at the British Library, and Ken Seddon, professor of chemistry at Queen's University, Belfast, were involved in the restoration of its copy of the book. The British Library website allows readers to view the Diamond Sūtra in its entirety.

Selected English translations

See also
 Science and technology of the Tang Dynasty

References

Further reading 
 Cole, Alan (2005). Text as Father: Paternal Seductions in Early Mahayana Buddhist Literature, Berkeley: U Cal Press, pp. 160–196. For a close reading of the text's rhetoric, see chapter 4, entitled "Be All You Can't Be, and Other Gainful Losses in the Diamond Sutra."
 William Gemmell, transl. (1912). The Diamond Sutra, London: Trübner.
 Joyce Morgan and Conrad Walters (2011). Journeys on the Silk Road: a desert explorer, Buddha’s secret library, and the unearthing of the world’s oldest printed book, Picador Australia, .
 Agócs, Tamás (2000). The Diamondness of the Diamond Sutra. Acta Orientalia Academiae Scientiarum Hungaricae 53, (1/2), 65–77

External links 

 Vajracchedikā Prajñāpāramitā Sūtra: English Translation, by Paul Harrison
 Vajracchedikā Prajñāpāramitā Sūtra: English Translation, Lapis Lazuli Texts
 The Diamond of Perfect Wisdom Sutra: English Translation, by Chung Tai Translation Committee
 Romanized Sanskrit and Devanagari of the Diamond Sutra in the Digital Sanskrit Buddhist Canon.
 Multilingual edition of Vajracchedikā in the Bibliotheca Polyglotta
 Conserving the Diamond Sutra, IDPUKvideo (2013)
 

Mahayana sutras
British Library oriental manuscripts
Chinese manuscripts
9th-century Chinese books
868
9th century in China
Dunhuang manuscripts
Public domain books
Tang dynasty culture